Hoplias patana is a species of trahiras. It is a freshwater fish which is known from Cayenne, French Guiana. The maximum length recorded for this species is 39.4 centimetres.

It was originally described by Achille Valenciennes in 1847, under the genus Macrodon. It was listed as a valid species of Hoplias by Osvaldo Takeshi Oyakawa in 2003.

References

External links
 Hoplias patana at ITIS
 Hoplias patana at www.fishwise.co.za

Erythrinidae
Taxa named by Achille Valenciennes
Fish described in 1847